Girolamo Foscari (1505–1563) was a Roman Catholic prelate who served as Bishop of Torcello (1526–1563).

Biography
Girolamo Foscari was born in Venice, Italy in 1505.
On 16 May 1526, he was appointed during the papacy of Pope Clement VII as Bishop of Torcello.
On 1 May 1542, he was consecrated bishop by Antonio Beccari, Bishop of Shkodrë, with Giorgio Andreasi, Bishop of Chiusi, and Livio Podocathor, Archbishop of Nicosia, serving as co-consecrators. 
He served as Bishop of Torcello until his death on 2 Jan 1563.

References

External links and additional sources
 (for Chronology of Bishops) 
 (for Chronology of Bishops) 

17th-century Roman Catholic bishops in the Republic of Venice
Bishops appointed by Pope Clement VII
1505 births
1563 deaths